McCormick Middle School is part of the Wellington Exempted Village School District (WEVSD), located in Wellington in Lorain County, Ohio.

History
The original  school was built in 1867 and was primarily used for educational and cafeteria space. It was hidden from view by the  addition in 1916. A second  addition was built in 1938 and consisted of an auditorium, a full-size gymnasium, and theater seating.

Myron T. Herrick, 42nd Governor of Ohio (1904-1906) and twice United States Ambassador to France (1912-1914 & 1921-1929), attended high school at the Wellington Union School.

On December 14, 2015, the building was demolished. The original school no longer stands, and a new McCormick Middle School was constructed adjacent to Wellington High School.

Telescope and Observatory
1922 saw the addition of an astronomical observatory with a 4-inch Bausch & Lomb refracting telescope. These items were gifts from the Wellington Alumni Association in memory of Prof. R.H. Kinnison, a former Superintendent of Wellington Schools. His hobbies included astronomy and related sciences. The total cost was quoted at $2,250, which included the observatory tower, telescope/mount and various accessories. The agreed location for this memorial was on the roof of the 1916 addition.

1938 Classroom/Auditorium Addition
In 1938, 15 new classrooms and an auditorium/gymnasium were approved by the Board of Education. The proposed total cost was $194,402 with $85,612 (45%) coming from a Federal Public Works Administration (P.W.A.) grant listed under "P.W.A. - Docket-No. OH-1673 F" and the remaining amount collected from a bond issue, which voters passed during a special election on August 6, 1938. The project formally started on July 22, 1938 and was completed September 5, 1939.

Architect
The additions were designed by Cleveland architect, Harry A. Fulton. During his career, Fulton was known as the "dean of school architects". He designed many school buildings in Cleveland and northeast Ohio. Henretta, Avon, Brownhelm and Columbia Schools in Lorain County, all built between 1921 - 1922, were designed by the architectural firm of Fulton, Taylor and Cahill.

Gallery

References

External links
 Google Map of the Wellington Historic District

Education in Lorain County, Ohio
Buildings and structures in Lorain County, Ohio
Public middle schools in Ohio